FeardotCom is a 2002 horror film directed by William Malone and starring Stephen Dorff, Natascha McElhone and Stephen Rea. The plot details a New York City detective investigating a series of mysterious deaths connected to a disturbing website. Director Malone's second feature for Warner Bros. after the release of House on Haunted Hill (1999), FeardotCom was an international co-production among companies based in the United States, Luxembourg, Germany, and the United Kingdom. The film was shot on location in Luxembourg and Montreal, Canada.

FeardotCom was released in the United States on August 30, 2002. FeardotCom received overwhelmingly negative reviews. FeardotCom was also one of 22 films to receive an 'F' rating from audiences polled at CinemaScore. It grossed $18.9 million worldwide against its $40 million budget.

Plot
Mike Reilly is an NYPD detective who is called to the scene of a mysterious death in the subway system. The victim, Polidori, exhibits bleeding from his eyes and other orifices and, by the frozen look on his face, appears to have seen something horrifying before being hit by a train. Department of Health researcher Terry Huston is intrigued by the find as well, particularly when several more victims show up with identical symptoms.

When a contagious virus is ruled out, Terry and Mike team up to discover what might be killing these people. Initially they are unable to find anything to connect the deaths together; after some more digging for clues, they eventually discover that all of the victims' computers crashed shortly before their passings. They send each of the victims' hard drives to Mike's friend, Denise Stone, who is a forensic specialist.

Denise discovers that all of the victims had visited a website called Feardotcom.com, which depicts voyeuristic torture murder. Upon looking at the site herself, Denise is subjected to various sights and sounds of torture that eventually drive her insane, resulting in her falling to her death from her apartment window.

Mike feels guilty, thinking that he should have never gotten Denise involved in the case. Terry figures out that people who visit the website die within 48 hours, apparently from what they feared most in their lives. Despite such dangerous knowledge, both she and Mike visit the site in order to figure out what is happening.

As they begin to experience paranoia and hallucinations (like the deceased), including that of a young girl and her inflatable ball, they race against time to figure out if any of it has any connection to an extremely vicious serial killer, Alistair Pratt, who has been eluding Mike and the FBI for years.

It is revealed that Feardotcom is, in fact, a ghost site made by one of Pratt's first victims, who is seeking revenge because people watched her being tortured and murdered. She was tortured by Pratt for 48 hours before she begged him to kill her, which explains why the victims have 48 hours to live. Mike and Terry track down Pratt and release the spirit of the murdered girl from the website, which kills Pratt. However, Mike is also killed by Pratt.

The ending scene shows Terry lying in her bed with her cat.  The phone rings but she hears no one on the line, only online static.  She hangs up and hugs the cat.

Cast

Production
Malone stated that his goal when agreeing to direct was to make the entire film look "basically like a nightmare." Stephen Dorff was cast as the lead in the film, while Stephen Rea was cast as the villain based on Malone's appreciation of him as one of his "favorite actors." Natascha McElhone was cast as the lead female role, and Malone stated in retrospect that he felt she had been miscast: "I mean, I love[d] having her in the film, don't get me wrong, but the film should have been rewritten for her, instead of being written for somebody who was showing off how good she is at her job. Natascha has this sort of competence and elegance, so you just don't buy that with her." Jeffrey Combs, who had appeared in Malone's previous feature, House on Haunted Hill, was cast in a supporting part as a detective.

Though set in New York City, the film was shot in Montreal, Québec, Canada, and in Luxembourg. Director William Malone had not intended to shoot the film in Luxembourg, but stated that the producers had scouted locations there which they believed "looked like" New York; as a result, Malone said the film ended up being a "weird take on New York rather than being New York." Some scenes, such as those in the subway stations, were shot on constructed sets built on sound stages. Malone stated in an audio commentary that the majority of the interiors scenes were also shot on sets.

The website featured in the film was designed by a Berlin-based digital design company.

Release
The film was released on August 9, 2002 in South Korea and on August 30, 2002 in the United States. It would receive subsequent theatrical releases in numerous countries throughout the ensuing months, debuting in the United Kingdom on June 27, 2003.

The film was released on DVD in January 2003.

Rating
The film was originally rated NC-17 due to extreme violence. After multiple trims and appeals, the film was finally re-rated R by the MPAA for "violence including grisly images of torture, nudity and language".

Reception

Box office
The film opened at number 5 at the US box office behind Signs, My Big Fat Greek Wedding, xXx, and Spy Kids 2: The Island of Lost Dreams, grossing $5.7 million its opening weekend showing on 2,550 screens. It earned an additional $2.3 million the following weekend (September 6–8), and $982,450 the subsequent weekend (September 13–15). The film screened in US theaters until Halloween, though by the weekend of October 25, the number of screens it was showing on had reduced to 92 in total.

The film's total domestic gross was $13.3 million, and $5.6 international, totaling $18.9 million worldwide.

Critical response
As of 2018, it holds a 3% approval rating on review aggregator website Rotten Tomatoes based on 101 reviews and has a weighted average of 2.65/10. The critics' consensus reads: "As frustrating as a 404 error, Fear Dot Com is a stylish, incoherent, and often nasty mess with few scares." At Metacritic, the film holds a 16/100 rating based on 20 reviews, indicating "overwhelming dislike". Audiences polled by CinemaScore gave the film a rare "F" grade on an A+ to F scale.

Roger Ebert criticized the film for its lack of originality, specifically, and its overt violence. Mark Kermode of The Observer and Cynthia Fuchs of PopMatters wrote of the premise's similarity to the Japanese film Kairo and David Cronenberg's Videodrome, as well as Hideo Nakata's Ringu.

Empire magazine gave the film one out of five stars, calling it "arguably the least imaginative, most pathetic horror of the decade." The Guardian called it a "nasty, badly acted horror film [...] like Marc Evans' My Little Eye or Olivier Assayas' execrable Demonlover, it manages to be both prurient and very, very naive about the internet." Roger Ebert gave the film two out of four stars and wrote, "strange, how good FeardotCom is, and how bad. The screenplay is a mess, and yet the visuals are so creative this is one of the rare bad films you might actually want to see" and praising the last 20 minutes as something which, if it "had been produced by a German impressionist in the 1920s, we'd be calling it a masterpiece." He added, "The movie is extremely violent; it avoided the NC-17 rating and earned an R, I understand, after multiple trims and appeals, and even now it is one of the most graphic horror films I've seen."

Jami Bernard of The New York Daily News said,  "The story is a mess, some of the images offensive, the acting under par and the dialogue silly."  Claudia Puig of USA Today said, "Feardotcom is the cinematic equivalent of spam in your e-mail inbox." Furthermore, Mick LaSalle of the San Francisco Chronicle said, "What we get in FearDotCom is more like something from a bad Clive Barker movie. In other words, it's badder than bad," while Stephen Holden of The New York Times said that it "is so rambling and disconnected it never builds any suspense."

Writing for The Globe and Mail, Liam Lacey wrote of the film's potential for cult status, adding: "but the movie's progression into rambling incoherence gives new meaning to the phrase "fatal script error."" Andrew Manning of Radio Free Entertainment stated, "Of all the trash I had to watch in 2002, the insipid FearDotCom easily ranks among the worst," and Oz of eFilmCritic.com stated: "In a year that has given us some of the worst films of all time, this must surely rank as the worst -- and that's a hard thing to do opposite Master of Disguise."

In his book The Cinema Dreams Its Rivals: Media Fantasy Films from Radio to the Internet, film scholar Paul Young praised the film's dark cinematography, writing: FearDotCom refuses to let CG penetrate its mise-en-scène... FearDotCom is set in New York, but instead of providing digitized skylines and enhanced locales to fudge the differences, FearDotCom simply plunges the city into the dark... In effect, [it] manages to incarnate a sense of what film "was" before CG, a sense it underscores by building its Monogram B-film environment around the Internet.

Accolades 
FeardotCom won "Worst Film" at the 2003 Dallas-Fort Worth Film Critics Association Awards and 'Grand Prize of European Fantasy Film in Silver' at 2003 Fantafestival. It was nominated for "Grand Prize of European Fantasy Film in Gold" at the 2004 Amsterdam Fantastic Film Festival and 'Best Film' at the 2002 Sitges - Catalan International Film Festival.

See also
List of ghost films

References

Works cited

Malone, William; Sebaldt, Christian (2003). FeardotCom. Audio commentary (DVD). Warner Bros.

External links
 Official site 
 
 

2002 films
2002 horror films
2000s ghost films
2000s serial killer films
American police detective films
American supernatural horror films
American splatter films
American serial killer films
British horror films
British serial killer films
German serial killer films
German supernatural horror films
Luxembourgian horror films
English-language German films
English-language Luxembourgian films
Films set in New York City
Films shot in Luxembourg
Films shot in Montreal
Films about snuff films
Franchise Pictures films
Warner Bros. films
Columbia Pictures films
Films directed by William Malone
Films scored by Nicholas Pike
Films about the Internet
Techno-horror films
2000s English-language films
2000s American films
2000s British films
2000s German films